The FitzGerald dynasty is a Hiberno-Norman or Cambro-Norman noble family.

FitzGerald may also refer to:

People
 FitzGerald (surname)

Places

Australia 
 Fitzgerald River National Park, Western Australia

Canada 
 Fitzgerald, Alberta

United States 
 Fitzgerald, Georgia
 Fitzgerald, Wisconsin
 Fitzgerald Marine Reserve, on the Pacific coast of Moss Beach, California

Business
 Fitzgerald's, live-music venue in Houston, Texas, USA
 Fitzgeralds Casino and Hotel (disambiguation)
 FitzGerald's Department Stores, department stores in Tasmania, Australia

Other uses
 FitzGerald (crater), lunar crater
 Fitzgerald factor, a name for high-molecular-weight kininogen, a blood coagulation protein
 Lorentz–FitzGerald contraction hypothesis, physics
 The SS Edmund Fitzgerald, ship that sank in Lake Superior
 "The Wreck of the Edmund Fitzgerald", a 1976 song by Gordon Lightfoot about the ship
 The Fitzgerald Inquiry, judicial inquiry into corruption in the Queensland police
 The FitzGerald Report, a 2005 UN report on the assassination of former Lebanese Prime Minister Rafik Hariri
 USS Fitzgerald (DDG-62), a destroyer of the United States Navy
 Fitzgeralds Casino and Hotel (disambiguation)

See also
 Fitzcarraldo (disambiguation)
 Justice Finch (disambiguation)